Khalifeh (also Romanized as Khalīfeh; also known as Khalīfa) is a village in Satar Rural District, Kolyai District, Sonqor County, Kermanshah Province, Iran. At the 2006 census, its population was 85, in 25 families.

References 

Populated places in Sonqor County